The 2012 KNSB Dutch Sprint Championships in speed skating were held at the Thialf ice stadium in Heerenveen, Netherlands.

Schedule

Medalist

Results

Men's Sprint

Men's results: SchaatsStatistieken.nl

Women's Sprint

Women's results: SchaatsStatistieken.nl

References

KNSB Dutch Sprint Championships
KNSB Dutch Sprint Championships
2012 Sprint
KNSB Dutch Sprint Championships, 2012